Cisthene angelus, the angel lichen moth, is a moth of the family Erebidae. It was described by Harrison Gray Dyar Jr. in 1904. It is found in North America.

References

Cisthenina
Moths described in 1904